The Pygmalion effect, or Rosenthal effect,  is a psychological phenomenon in which high expectations lead to improved performance in a given area. The effect is named for the Greek myth of Pygmalion, the sculptor who fell so much in love with the perfectly beautiful statue he created that the statue came to life. The psychologists Robert Rosenthal and Lenore Jacobson, in their book Pygmalion in the Classroom, borrowed something of the myth by advancing the idea that teachers' expectations of their students affect the students' performance, a view that has been called into question as a result of later research findings.

Rosenthal and Jacobson held that high expectations lead to better performance and low expectations lead to worse, both effects leading to self-fulfilling prophecy. According to the Pygmalion effect, the targets of the expectations internalize their positive labels, and those with positive labels succeed accordingly; a similar process works in the opposite direction in the case of low expectations. The idea behind the Pygmalion effect is that increasing the leader's expectation of the follower's performance will result in better follower performance. Within sociology, the effect is often cited with regard to education and social class.

Rosenthal–Jacobson study 
Robert Rosenthal and Lenore Jacobson's study showed that, if teachers were led to expect enhanced performance from children, then the children's performance was enhanced. By the same token, if teachers were led to expect lower performance from children, then the children's performance would be diminished. The authors purported that the study's results supported the hypothesis that performance can be positively or negatively influenced by the expectations of others. This phenomenon is called the observer-expectancy effect. Rosenthal argued that biased expectancies could affect reality and create self-fulfilling prophecies.

All students in a single California elementary school were given a disguised IQ test at the beginning of the study. These scores were not disclosed to teachers. Teachers were told that some of their students (about 20% of the school chosen at random) could be expected to be "intellectual bloomers" that year, doing better than expected in comparison to their classmates. The bloomers' names were made known to the teachers. At the end of the study, all students were again tested with the same IQ test used at the beginning of the study.  All six grades in both experimental and control groups showed a mean gain in IQ from before the test to after the test.  However, first- and second-graders showed statistically significant gains favoring the experimental group of "intellectual bloomers." This led to the conclusion that teacher expectations, particularly for the youngest children, can influence student achievement. Rosenthal believed that even attitude or mood could positively affect the students when the teacher was made aware of the "bloomers." The teacher may pay closer attention to and even treat the child differently in times of difficulty.

Rosenthal predicted that elementary school teachers may subconsciously behave in ways that facilitate and encourage the students' success. When finished, Rosenthal theorized that future studies could be implemented to find teachers who would encourage their students naturally without changing their teaching methods. Rosenthal and Jacobson's study of the Pygmalion effect was criticized for both weak methodology and lack of replicability (see Pygmalion in the Classroom).

The prior research that motivated this study was conducted in 1911 by psychologists regarding the case of Clever Hans, a horse that gained notoriety because it was supposed to be able to read, spell, and solve math problems by using its hoof to answer. Many skeptics suggested that questioners and observers were unintentionally signaling Clever Hans. For instance, whenever Clever Hans was asked a question the observers' demeanor usually elicited a certain behavior from the subject that in turn confirmed their expectations. For example, Clever Hans would be given a math problem to solve, and the audience would get very tense the closer he tapped his foot to the right number, thus giving Hans the clue he needed to tap the correct number of times.

Criticism of the Pygmalion effect

The educational psychologist Robert L. Thorndike described the poor quality of the Pygmalion study. The problem with the study was that the instrument used to assess the children's IQ scores was seriously flawed. The average reasoning IQ score for the children in one regular class was in the mentally disabled range, a highly unlikely outcome in a regular class in a garden variety school. In the end, Thorndike concluded that the Pygmalion findings were worthless. It is more likely that the rise in IQ scores from the mentally disabled range was the result of regression toward the mean, not teacher expectations. Moreover, a meta-analysis conducted by Raudenbush showed that when teachers had gotten to know their students for two weeks, the effect of a prior expectancy induction was reduced to virtually zero.

Students' views of teachers 
Teachers are also affected by the children in the classroom. Teachers reflect what is projected into them by their students. An experiment done by Jenkins and Deno (1969) submitted teachers to a classroom of children who had either been told to be attentive, or unattentive, to the teachers' lecture. They found that teachers who were in the attentive condition would rate their teaching skills as higher. Similar findings by Herrell (1971) suggested that when a teacher was preconditioned to classrooms as warm or cold, the teacher would start to gravitate towards their precondition. To further this concept, Klein (1971) did the same kind of study involving teachers still unaware of any precondition to the classroom but with the class full of confederates who were instructed to act differently during periods over the course of the lecture. "Klein reported that there was little difference between students' behaviors in the natural and the positive conditions." In a more observational study designed to remove the likes of the Hawthorne effect, Oppenlander (1969) studied the top and bottom 20% of students in the sixth grade from a school that tracks and organizes its students under such criteria.

In the workplace 
Leader expectations of an employee may alter leader behavior. The behavior a leader directs at an employee can affect employee behavior consistent with the leader's expectations. For example, a leader may expect an employee to be engaged in learning activities. In turn, the employee may engage in more learning, consistent with the idea self-fulfilling prophesy. Of course, leaders have power over employees (including the power to fire an employee) and, thus, behavior change in employees may be the result of that power differential.

See also 
 List of eponymous laws
 Matthew effect
 Golem effect
 Pygmalion in the Classroom
 Placebo effect
 Sports psychology
 Stereotype threat
 Positive feedback loop
Self-fulfilling prophecy
 Law of attraction

References

Further reading

External links 
 Pygmalion effect in banks, at school, and in the army
 Pygmalion Effect Video

Cognitive biases